The Turkish March (Marcia alla turca) is a classical march theme by Ludwig van Beethoven. It was written for the 1809 Six variations, Op. 76, and in the Turkish style. Later in 1811, Beethoven included the Turkish March in a play by August von Kotzebue called The Ruins of Athens (Op. 113), which premiered in Budapest, Hungary in 1812.

The march is in B-flat major, tempo vivace and  time. Its dynamic scheme is highly suggestive of a procession passing by, starting out pianissimo, poco a poco rising to a fortissimo climax and then receding back to pianissimo by the coda.

In popular culture 
Franz Liszt wrote a version for piano and orchestra in 1837 entitled "Fantasie über Motiven aus Beethovens Ruinen von Athen" (S. 122). He also wrote a piano transcription in 1846, titled "Capriccio alla turca sur des motifs de Beethoven" (S. 388). Anton Rubinstein arranged a popular piano version of the march in B major. Sergei Rachmaninoff further arranged Rubinstein's version, heard on piano roll (1928).

An electronic version known as "The Elephant Never Forgets" from a 1970 album "Moog Indigo" by electronic music pioneer Jean-Jacques Perrey was used as theme for the series El Chavo del Ocho. On 16 November 2009, Perrey along with Kingsley, Sylvain Meunier and the heirs of Harry Breuer, Frances, Anthony and Robert sued the companies; Televisa for the use of their melodies without permission, Xenon Pictures, Lions Gate, Univision and Galavision were also involved in the lawsuits, however Chespirito was not directly involved in the lawsuit. In 2010, Perrey and the defendants reached a legal settlement, in which the defendants had to pay for the use of the melodies "The Elephant Never Forgets", "Baroque Hoedown" and "Country Rock Polka", in addition Perrey and Kingsley's credit is now prominently mentioned on any promotional materials of El Chavo del Ocho.

References

External links
 
 The Ruins of Athens: Turkish March and Overture, performed by Boston Civic Symphony at YouTube

Compositions by Ludwig van Beethoven
Incidental music
1809 compositions
Compositions in B-flat major